″This is a list of hospitals in Costa Rica which are open and treating patients.

San José Province

San José

NATIONAL HEALTH SERVICE: Caja Costarricense de Seguro Social
 Hospital San Juan de Dios, built in 1854 and partially rebuilt in 1995, 2004 and 2009
 Hospital Nacional de Niños, built in 1961
 Hospital Dr Rafael Ángel Calderón Guardia, built in 1946 (rebuilt in 1990 and 2015)
 Centro Nacional de Rehabilitación, built in 1973
 Hospital Dr. Raúl Blanco Cervantes (for gerontological and geriatric healthcare), built in 1950 and rebuilt in 2016
 Hospital Nacional de las Mujeres Dr Ricardo Carit Eva
 Hospital México, built in 1969
 Hospital Nacional Psiquiátrico, built in 1970

NATIONAL INSURANCE INSTITUTE: Instituto Nacional de Seguros
 Hospital de Trauma, built in 2010

PRIVATE OPERATORS in San José
 Hospital Clínica Bíblica (San José), built in 1927 and rebuilt in 1990, 2002 and 2008
 Hospital Clínica Católica
 Hospital Clínica Santa Rita 
 Hospital Metropolitano (San José)

Escazú

PRIVATE OPERATORS in Escazú
 Hospital CIMA (Escazú), built in 2000

Santa Ana

PRIVATE OPERATORS in Santa Ana
 Hospital Clínica Bíblica (Santa Ana)
 Hospital Metropolitano (Santa Ana)

Tibás

PRIVATE OPERATORS in Tibás
 Hospital Clínica Unibe
 Hospital Metropolitano (Tibás)

Guadalupe

PRIVATE OPERATORS in Guadalupe
 Hospital Cristiano Jerusalem

Pérez Zeledón

NATIONAL HEALTH SERVICE: Caja Costarricense de Seguro Social
 Hospital Dr Fernando Escalante Pradilla

Alajuela Province

Alajuela

NATIONAL HEALTH SERVICE: Caja Costarricense de Seguro Social
 Hospital San Rafael

San Ramon

NATIONAL HEALTH SERVICE: Caja Costarricense de Seguro Social
 Hospital Dr Carlos Luis Valverde Vega

Ciudad Quesada

NATIONAL HEALTH SERVICE: Caja Costarricense de Seguro Social
 Hospital de San Carlos

PRIVATE OPERATOR in Ciudad Quesada
 Hospital San Carlos Borromeo

Grecia

NATIONAL HEALTH SERVICE: Caja Costarricense de Seguro Social
 Hospital San Francisco de Asís

Upala

NATIONAL HEALTH SERVICE: Caja Costarricense de Seguro Social
 Hospital de Upala

Los Chiles

NATIONAL HEALTH SERVICE: Caja Costarricense de Seguro Social
 Hospital de Los Chiles

Cartago Province

Cartago

NATIONAL HEALTH SERVICE: Caja Costarricense de Seguro Social
 Hospital Max Peralta in Cartago

PRIVATE OPERATOR in Cartago
 Hospital Universal

Turrialba

NATIONAL HEALTH SERVICE: Caja Costarricense de Seguro Social
 Hospital William Allen in Turrialba

Heredia Province

Heredia

NATIONAL HEALTH SERVICE: Caja Costarricense de Seguro Social
 Hospital San Vicente de Paul

Guanacaste Province

Liberia

NATIONAL HEALTH SERVICE: Caja Costarricense de Seguro Social
 Hospital Enrique Baltodano Briceño in Liberia

PRIVATE OPERATOR in Liberia
 Hospital CIMA Guanacaste
 Hospital Clínico San Rafael Arcángel

Nicoya

NATIONAL HEALTH SERVICE: Caja Costarricense de Seguro Social
 Hospital de la Anexion

Puntarenas Province

Puntarenas

NATIONAL HEALTH SERVICE: Caja Costarricense de Seguro Social
 Hospital Monseñor Sanabria in Puntarenas

Golfito

NATIONAL HEALTH SERVICE: Caja Costarricense de Seguro Social
 Hospital Lic Manuel Mora Valverde

Ciudad Neilly

NATIONAL HEALTH SERVICE: Caja Costarricense de Seguro Social
 Hospital de Ciudad Neilly

San Vito

NATIONAL HEALTH SERVICE: Caja Costarricense de Seguro Social
 Hospital de San Vito

Puerto Cortés

NATIONAL HEALTH SERVICE: Caja Costarricense de Seguro Social
 Hospital Dr Tomás Casas Casajús

Quepos

NATIONAL HEALTH SERVICE: Caja Costarricense de Seguro Social
 Hospital Dr Max Terán Valls

Limón Province

Limon

NATIONAL HEALTH SERVICE: Caja Costarricense de Seguro Social
 Hospital Dr. Tony Facio Castro

Guápiles

NATIONAL HEALTH SERVICE: Caja Costarricense de Seguro Social
 Hospital de Guápiles

 
Hospitals
C
Costa Rica